Rob Altemeyer is a politician in Manitoba, Canada. He was a member of the Manitoba legislature from 2003 to 2019. Altemeyer has long been involved in social justice and environmental issues in the Winnipeg area.  He was responsible for implementing a recycling program at the University of Manitoba, and was one of the founders of the Global Change Game (an internationally respected educational program) while still a student.  Altemeyer served a two-year term on the Council of Canadians, and has taken part in a variety of activities in the fair trade/anti-globalization movement. In 1998, he organized an anti-globalization study group known as Beyond McWorld.

Altemeyer has also been involved in the Wolseley Neighbourhood Advisory Committee, which is involved in over two dozen local capital improvement projects.  Prior to the 2003 provincial election, he served as an assistant to New Democratic Party of Manitoba (NDP) Cabinet Minister Tim Sale. In the 2003 general election, Altemeyer was elected to the provincial legislature as a New Democrat for the centre-Winnipeg riding of Wolseley.  He received 3482 votes, against 1193 for his nearest competitor, Green Party leader Markus Buchart.  He was re-elected in the 2007, 2011, and 2016 provincial elections. He did not run for re-election in 2019.

Biography
Altemeyer was born and raised in Winnipeg, Manitoba, and was educated at the University of Manitoba where he received a Bachelor of Arts degree in Anthropology and a Master's Degree in Natural Resource Management.  He also played college baseball for two years in North Dakota, on an athletic scholarship. Rob Altemeyer is the son of Canadian psychologist Bob Altemeyer.

Electoral record

References 

Living people
New Democratic Party of Manitoba MLAs
University of Manitoba alumni
Year of birth missing (living people)
Politicians from Winnipeg
21st-century Canadian politicians